Frederick Charles Davao, professionally known as Ricky Davao (born May 30, 1961), is a Filipino actor, television director, and industrial management engineer (graduated from Mapua Institute of Technology. He is the husband of actress Jackie Lou Blanco. He is the younger brother of Bing Davao and the son of Charlie Davao.

In theatre, he is best known for portraying a fictionalized version of Bongbong Marcos in the play Bongbong at Kris in the 1980s.

Filmography

Films

TV series

As a TV director

Awards

References

1961 births
Living people
Filipino people of Jordanian descent
Filipino people of Spanish descent
Filipino television directors
Star Circle Quest
Filipino male comedians
Filipino television personalities
Filipino male stage actors
Mapúa University alumni
People from Manila
People from Capiz
Visayan people
Filipino male film actors

ABS-CBN personalities
ABS-CBN people
GMA Network personalities
GMA Network (company) people
TV5 (Philippine TV network) personalities